Flagstaff House, built in 1846, is the oldest example of Western-style architecture remaining in Hong Kong. It is located at 10 Cotton Tree Drive, Central – within the Hong Kong Park.

It has been a longtime residence of the Commander of the British forces in Hong Kong during colonial times. Today Flagstaff House houses the Museum of Tea Ware.

History

Flagstaff House had been named as Headquarter House until 1932. The site chosen was a small bluff above the barracks and above Queen's Road, then at the waterfront.

The building was designed in Greek revival style. Historians suspect it was designed either by Murdoch Bruce, a Scotsman who was inspector of buildings, or by Lieutenant Bernard Collinson of the Royal Engineers. The first occupant was Major-General George Charles D'Aguilar, General Officer Commanding from 1844 to 1846 who also held the post of Lieutenant Governor.

The west and east wings were shelled during the Japanese invasion in the Second World War; it also suffered bomb damage. The Japanese repaired it and the Commandant took the building as his residence during the occupation.

After the war, Flagstaff House was again the Commander's residence until 1978, when the Commander moved to a purpose built house on Barker Road. It was handed over by the military to the civilian Hong Kong Government as part of the recovery of Victoria Barracks. The Government put it under the responsibility of the Urban Council in 1981.

The building was declared a monument in 1989. It was restored as far as possible to its original mid-19th-century appearance, structurally reinforced, and the interior was to be modified so that it could be used as a museum.

Museum of Tea Ware

In 1984, it was converted into the Flagstaff House Museum of Tea Ware, a branch museum of the Hong Kong Museum of Art. The museum specialises in the collection, study and display of teaware, including many samples of the Yixing teapot, from the Jiangsu of China, as well as the world's oldest known extant teapot.

A new wing, the K.S. Lo Gallery, was built and opened in 1995. It is named after local collector (and Vitasoy founder Dr. Kwee Seong Lo), who made a donation to the city in the 1970s. This donation now constitutes the core of the museum's collection. The new gallery contains a collection of ceramics and Chinese seals.

See also
 History of Hong Kong
 Hong Kong tea culture
 List of buildings and structures in Hong Kong
 List of museums in Hong Kong

References

External links

 LCSD – Tea Museum

1846 establishments in Hong Kong
Art museums and galleries in Hong Kong
Central, Hong Kong
Declared monuments of Hong Kong
Decorative arts museums in China
Greek Revival houses
Hong Kong Park
Landmarks in Hong Kong
Museums established in 1984
Official residences in Hong Kong
Teaware
Tea museums